The 2013–14 season was Ross County's first season in the newly formed Scottish Premiership and their second consecutive season in the top flight of Scottish football. Ross County also competed in the Scottish Cup and the League Cup.

Summary

Season
Ross County finished seventh in the Scottish Premiership with 40 points. They reached the second round of the League Cup, losing to Stranraer, and the fourth round of the Scottish Cup, losing to Hibernian.

Results and fixtures

Pre season / Friendlies

Scottish Premiership

Scottish League Cup

Scottish Cup

Squad statistics

Appearances

|-
|colspan="12"|Players who left the club during the 2013–14 season
|-

|}

Team statistics

League table

Division summary

Transfers

Players in

Players out

References

External links
 Ross County 2013–14 at Soccerbase.com (select relevant season from dropdown list)

Ross County F.C. seasons
Ross County